Alphapharm is a generic drug manufacturing company based in Australia. Alphapharm manufactures many different generic pharmaceutical medicines and exports to 50 countries. It is owned by Mylan Pharmaceuticals (USA) which merged with Upjohn on November 16, 2020, to become Viatris. Alphapharm's logo is a green circle with a white lowercase alpha enclosed. Alphapharm is the greatest sole supplier to the Australian Pharmaceutical Benefits Scheme by number of PBS subsidised prescriptions.

References

External links

Pharmaceutical companies of Australia
Companies based in Sydney
Pharmaceutical companies established in 1982
1982 establishments in Australia